Antonín Mrkos (27 January 1918, Střemchoví – 29 May 1996, Prague) was a Czech astronomer.

Biography
Mrkos entered the University in Brno in 1938. His studies were interrupted by the onset of World War II, and in 1945 he became a staff member at the Skalnaté Pleso Observatory in Slovakia. It was from here that he carried out his extremely active cometary programme and became the discoverer of several unusual comets, the most famous of them the bright Comet 1957d.

He was the second Czech in Antarctica and the first Czechoslovak to reach the Southern Pole of Inaccessibility as a member of the 3rd Soviet Antarctic Expedition (1957–1959). The Czechoslovakian flag was the second flag raised after the flag of the USSR. He returned to Antarctica as the head of the four-member Czechoslovakian crew in the seventh Soviet Antarctic Expedition (1961–1963). He was studying auroras among other things.

He was invited for what would have been his third expedition to the Antarctic but could not participate because of an almost fatal accident. It is thought someone tried to injure or to kill him by adding a bottle of strongly concentrated detergent among his other bottles of mineral water. Since this accident he could only eat liquid meals for the rest of his life.

In 1965 he became director of Kleť Observatory. Beginning in 1968 he made photographic observations at Kleť and extended this activity to minor planets in 1977. For many years he was the most regular contributor of data to the Minor Planet Center. He was President of Commission 6 from 1985 until 1988 (and Vicepresident from 1982 until 1985). He was associate professor at the Charles University in Prague and the University of South Bohemia. Mrkos died in 1996 in Prague, aged 78.

He discovered or co-discovered thirteen comets. Among these were the periodic comets 18D/Perrine–Mrkos, 45P/Honda–Mrkos–Pajdušáková, 124P/Mrkos and 143P/Kowal–Mrkos. He also discovered the bright non-periodic comet C/1957 P1 (or, in the nomenclature of the time, comet 1957d). He discovered a number of asteroids (273 in total), including the Amor asteroid 5797 Bivoj and Trojan asteroid 3451 Mentor.

Mrkos named asteroids 6758 Jesseowens in honour of Jesse Owens and 2747 Český Krumlov after the historic town of the same name. Another main-belt asteroid, 3357 Tolstikov, was named in honour of Yevgeny Tolstikov with whom he had explored the Antarctic in his youth. Fellow astronomer Lyudmila Chernykh named 1832 Mrkos in his honour, while Mrkos gratified her and her husband Nikolai with 2325 Chernykh.

List of discovered minor planets

See also

References 
 

1918 births
1996 deaths
People from Brno-Country District
People from the Margraviate of Moravia
Czechoslovak astronomers
Czech astronomers
Discoverers of asteroids
Discoverers of comets
Academic staff of Charles University
Academic staff of the University of South Bohemia